Louis Barnett (born 2 November 1991) from Kinver, Staffordshire is a licensed chocolatier who became the youngest supplier of both the Sainsbury's and Waitrose supermarket chains at the age of 14. He left school at the age of 11 because of learning difficulties and was later diagnosed with dyslexia and developmental coordination disorder. His parents continued his education through homeschooling. He started making chocolates for friends and family and in 2005 he started his company Chokolit Ltd. to deal with the growing demand.  Winner of " Emerging Entrepreneur of the Year Award " 2011  . He received the Lord Carter Award for excellence in the food industry, presented to him in The House Of Lords 2009, was nominated for a Young Entrepreneur of the Year Award in 2007. He was also a finalist in the teen category of the 2007 Enterprising Young Brits Awards.

Louis is now an active motivational speaker and business consultant.

Early life and education
Louis Barnett was raised by his parents Phil and Mary Barnett in the village of Kinver, Staffordshire. Besides his work as a chocolatier, he is a champagne connoisseur and an amateur photographer.

Throughout school, Barnett struggled to meet the teachers' expectations. They were satisfied with his vocabulary and general knowledge, but they focused on his weak points like maths and written work.
Because other children didn't understand him, he would get into fights and be the target of bullying. At the age of 11, after just six weeks of secondary school, his parents took him out of the regular schooling system and gave him a vocational homeschooling program. His problems were later discovered to be caused by dyslexia and developmental coordination disorder. His parents hired a tutor (Jan) who helped with his studies, but was also encouraged, by his parents to follow his interests. He decided to learn about chocolate and champagne. He has since taken up fencing to improve his coordination (which is affected by developmental coordination disorder).

Career
After a falconry experience day, Barnett spent 18 months working as a volunteer at a falconry centre. He started out cleaning and gardening, but was eventually trusted to fly the birds of prey in shows and corporate events. His experience resulted in the permission to keep his pet African eagle owl Jewl. One day he bought a book titled "Belgian Chocolate Cakes and Chocolate" from a nearby garden centre. He started by making chocolate mousse and cakes, but eventually he focused on making chocolates and he became the youngest person to go on a course (and get certified) at the Banbury branch of the prestigious Callebaut Chocolate Academy. and he also works as a public speaker.

Chokolit
Louis started making chocolates in his kitchen for friends and family, but when he started selling the chocolates to local businesses, he had to move the operation to the garage. Chokolit was founded in 2005 and funded with a local grant of £5,000 and a £500 loan from his grandparents to buy a special machine that regulates chocolate temperature. The name of the company was chosen because that was how he used to spell chocolate due to his dyslexia.

Soon his parents' garage was too small to deal with the growing demand and production had to relocate to a new factory in Bridgnorth, Shropshire. The factory was officially opened by South Staffordshire MP Sir Patrick Cormack on 14 December 2007. The company's signature product is the edible chocolate box which Barnett created when he was 13 to cut down on packaging expenses chocolate handbags using 53% pure dark chocolate supplied by Callebaut.

Barnett now works with his parents and exports his chocolates to many different countries around the world.

Activism
Barnett is involved in a lobby for the reclassification of palm oil In contrast to other vegetable oils which have been connected to the health and longevity of Mediterranean people, palm oil is saturated and not healthy. Despite this, palm oil is widely used in the confectionery industry which he believes devalues the product. It is also used as a bio fuel. He argues that the loss of rain forest to provide space for palm plantations causes the destruction of the only remaining habitat of Sumatran orang-utans and that together with the carbon dioxide formed by burning the oil it leads to a net increase of carbon dioxide in the atmosphere.

In support of this effort he has released a range of chocolate bars called "Biting Back Bar" which he launched on 29 May 2008 at Chester Zoo, the first place to stock the bars.
The first bar, the "Orang-utan Biting Back Bar", contains dark chocolate bar and has a hint of orange. It is sold by Chokolit, and several British zoos.

Early in 2008, the MP who opened Chokolit's Bridgnorth production facility arranged for Barnett to meet Prime Minister Gordon Brown and conservative leader David Cameron at the Houses of Parliament. He discussed his views on palm oil with the politicians, showed the first "Biting Back Bar" and discussed opening a new outlet with House of Commons catering chiefs. Cameron called Barnett "a most remarkable young man who has the makings of becoming one of the significant entrepreneurs of the next decade".

Awards and honours
2011 Emerging Entrepreneur of the Year Award (won) Insider business Awards, Belfry 
Lord Carter Award for excellence in the food industry (won)
Young Entrepreneur of the Year Award 2007 (nominated)
2007 Enterprising Young Brits Awards (finalist, teen category)
Heart of England Fine Foods Diamond Awards (shortlisted, confectionery category)
Food Processing Awards 2007(finalist, Packaging Innovation of the Year)
Louis was awarded the honour of "Young Champion" in 2010 at the inaugural Youth Olympic Games in Singapore and attended at the "What Makes A Young Champion?" event.

References

External links
Official website

1991 births
21st-century English businesspeople
Businesspeople in confectionery
English child businesspeople
Chocolatiers
Living people
People from Kinver
Business people from Staffordshire